Szaundra Diedrich (born 18 May 1993) is a German judoka.

She is the gold medallist of the 2015 Judo Grand Prix Tbilisi in the –70 kg category.

References

External links
 

1993 births
Living people
German female judoka
Judoka at the 2015 European Games
European Games medalists in judo
European Games silver medalists for Germany
European Games bronze medalists for Germany
21st-century German women